Erland Asdahl (6 April 1921, Nes – 19 July 1988) was a Norwegian politician for the Centre Party.

He was elected to the Norwegian Parliament from Akershus in 1977, but was not re-elected in 1981. He had previously served as a deputy representative during the terms 1954–1957, 1958–1961, 1965–1969 and 1969–1973.

On the local level he was a member of the executive committee of Nes municipal council during the terms 1959–1963 and 1971–1975. From 1959 to 1967 and 1971 to 1975 he was also a member of Akershus county council. He was a member of the national party board from 1952 to 1956, and chaired the local party chapter from 1956 to 1957.

A dedicated Lutheran, he chaired the Diocese Council of Borg from 1970 to 1974.

References

1921 births
1988 deaths
Members of the Storting
Akershus politicians
Centre Party (Norway) politicians
Norwegian Lutherans
People from Nes, Akershus
20th-century Norwegian politicians
20th-century Lutherans